Tom Fitzgerald (born March 31, 1966) is an American handball player. He competed in the men's tournament at the 1996 Summer Olympics.

References

External links
 

1966 births
Living people
American male handball players
Olympic handball players of the United States
Handball players at the 1996 Summer Olympics
Place of birth missing (living people)
Handball players at the 2003 Pan American Games
Pan American Games medalists in handball
Pan American Games bronze medalists for the United States
Medalists at the 2003 Pan American Games
21st-century American people